George William Allan,  (January 9, 1822 – July 24, 1901), was a Canadian lawyer and politician. He served as the 11th Mayor of Toronto and later as Speaker of the Senate of Canada.

Life and career
Allan attended Upper Canada College and served with the Bank Rifle Corps when it helped put down the 1837 Upper Canada Rebellion. He went on to study law and was called to the bar in 1846 when he also married his first wife, Louisa Maud Robinson.

Allan travelled extensively before beginning his law practice. He toured Europe, the Nile River, Syria, the Holy Land, Turkey, and Greece giving him a lifelong appreciation of travel and winning him election to the Royal Geographical Society.

He was a Toronto alderman from 1849 until 1855, when he was elected the 11th Mayor of Toronto. In 1858, he entered national politics representing York on the Legislative Council until Canadian Confederation. In 1867 he was nominated to the Senate of Canada as one of its first members and sat as a Conservative. In 1869 he was appointed government trustee for municipal bond fund of the Toronto and Nipissing Railway. He was chairman of the Standing Committee on Banking and Commerce for many years and was Speaker from 1888 until 1891. He remained in the Upper House until his death in 1901.

Allan's interests included education, science, culture and art. He was the most important patron of the artist, Paul Kane, enabling him to live a life as a professional artist, and presided over such bodies as the Royal Canadian Institute, the Ontario Society of Artists, the Toronto Conservatory of Music and the Ontario Historical Society. He served as chancellor of Trinity College. He donated to the city of Toronto a piece of land which formed the nucleus of Allan Gardens. He was also active in the Synod of the Church of England and was president of the Upper Canada Bible Society. He died in 1901, aged 79, at his residence, Moss Park, in Toronto.

Family
Allan's father was William Allan, of York (Toronto). William Allan was a pioneer who settled what was then the Township of York during John Graves Simcoe's term as governor. William Allan eventually became the city's first postmaster and was appointed to the Legislative Council of Upper Canada. He was a supporter of the Family Compact and was also a member of the Orange Order in Canada.

Allan's mother was Leah Tyrer Gamble, daughter of Dr. John Gamble. She died in Toronto on October I7, 1848, aged 58.
  
After the death of Allan's first wife, Louisa Robinson, he married Adelaide Schreiber, with whom he had 6 children: George William Allan, Jr., Arthur, Bingham, Maye, Maude, and Audrey.

Gallery

References

External links
 

 
 Speakers of the Senate biography

1822 births
1901 deaths
Lawyers in Ontario
Fellows of the Royal Geographical Society
Mayors of Toronto
Members of the Legislative Council of the Province of Canada
Members of the King's Privy Council for Canada
Canadian people of Scottish descent
Canadian Anglicans
Speakers of the Senate of Canada
Upper Canada College alumni